Alice Mackenzie may refer to:

 Alice McKenzie (died 1889), murder victim
 Alice Mackenzie (author) (1873–1963), New Zealand author and settler